"What You Waiting For" is a song released by Korean-Canadian singer Jeon Somi. It was released by The Black Label and Interscope Records on July 22, 2020.

Background and release
On July 14, 2020, The Black Label released a promotional poster for the song with the release date on it, confirming that Somi would make a surprise comeback in about a week. Then, on July 15, they released the second promotional poster, also unveiling the title of the song "What You Waiting For". The following day, a credits poster was unveiled revealing that Somi was involved in the songs's writing and production as well. On July 18, the third promotional poster was released. On July 22, the song and its music video were released for digital download and streaming.

Composition
"What You Waiting For" was written and produced by Jeon Somi alongside Teddy, Danny Chung, R.Tee and 24. The final version was fully recorded at The Black Label in Seoul, South Korea on February 2020, five months before the release, on July 22 of the same year. It is an upbeat R&B, dance-pop, synth-pop, electronica and power-pop track that incorporate elements of trop-house, EDM-pop, moombahton and 2010s house beats. The track built around an "emotional" chord progression that contrasts with "the bright" synth sound, which is considered different from somi's previous songs. The track "opens with a subtle synth-pop production, bouncing through DIY-vibe electronica and a racing, power-pop chorus as Somi tells an apprehensive lover 'Baby, I’ve been waiting for you all this time!". In the lyrics, somi narrates a story about a girl who is waiting for a confession from her crush, where she asks him "a bold question", which is, "What you waiting for?". As quoted from an interview, Somi told that there's no specific inspiration for the song. But it potentially might be from the wait of the late night tacos and chicken wings.

Music video
On July 17, the first music video teaser was released. Three days later, the second music video teaser was released. A day after, the third music video teaser was released. On July 22, the music video was released. The video amassed over six million views in its first 24 hours of release. By November 2020, the music video had gathered more than 18 million views.

As quoted from Forbes, "The video showed Somi who looked more confident than ever embracing different looks and sides of herself as she literally breaks through barriers." In an interview with "Idol Radio," Somi explained that she played  'sub-characters' in her music video. She explained, “This time, I played 8 roles per person. Looking at the timid Somi trapped in the frame she made, the strong Somi continues to tell her to go out and express herself and be confident". “At the end, as the timid Somi and the strong Somi combine, a new Somi with a sword in her head was born.”

Commercial performance
The song peaked at number 53 on the South Korean Gaon chart becoming Somi's third highest entry on the chart. In Malaysia the song peaked at number 8 becoming her first top ten hit in the country. In Singapore the song hit number two becoming her highest-charting song there. The song also peaked at number 8 on the Billboard World Digital Song Sales chart becoming her second top 10 entry on the chart.

Accolades 
On August 6, 2020, Somi took her first music show trophy with the song on Mnet's M Countdown.

Credits and personal
Credits adopted from album liner notes and Tidal.

Studios
 The Black Label Studio – recording 
 Gudwin music group – mixing 
 The Lap – mixing 
 Sterling Sound – mastering 

Song credits
 Somi – vocals, lyricist, composer, music producer
 Teddy Park – lyricist, composer, music producer, creative director, executive 
 Danny Chung – lyricist 
 R. Tee – composer, arranger, music producer 
 24 – composer, arranger, music producer 
 Youngju Bang – recording engineer
 Yong-in Choi – recording engineer
 Josh Gudwin – mixing
 Jason Roberts – mixing
 Chris Gehringer – mastering
Visual credits
 Gee Eun – visual director & stylist
 Visual team
 Onyou kim
 Monica Kim
 Artwork team 
 Seuki Kim 
 Jeong Yoon Yoon
 Chansol Joo
 Hyona Park
 Youngsun Cho
 photographer team
Jiyoung Yoon 
 Chae Dae Han 
 Junkyung Lee
 Heejin Kim
 Stylist team
 Jin Lim 
Soojeong I'm
Hye Young Jung

Charts

Weekly charts

Monthly charts

Release history

See also 
 List of M Countdown Chart winners (2020)

References

2020 songs
2020 singles
Interscope Records singles
Dance-pop songs
Power pop songs
Electronica songs
South Korean synth-pop songs
South Korean contemporary R&B songs
Songs written by Teddy Park